Albert James "Alby" Broadby (10 August 1917 – 16 November 2012) was an Australian politician.

He was born in Queenstown. In 1968 he was elected to the Tasmanian Legislative Council as the independent member for Gordon. He was President of the Council from 1984 to 1988, when he retired from politics.

References

1917 births
2012 deaths
Independent members of the Parliament of Tasmania
Members of the Tasmanian Legislative Council
Presidents of the Tasmanian Legislative Council
20th-century Australian politicians